Mattia is an Italian given name for males and, less frequently, females. Also a surname, it may refer to:

Given name
Mattia Altobelli (born 1983), professional Italian footballer
Mattia Battistini (1856–1928), Italian operatic baritone
Mattia Benedetti, Italian painter
Mattia Biso (born 1977), Italian midfielder for Frosinone Calcio
Mattia Bodano (born 1990), Italian midfielder
Mattia Bortoloni (1696–1750), Italian painter of the Rococo period
Mattia Cadorin (mid 17th century), an Italian engraver and publisher who flourished at Padua c. 1648
Mattia Carpanese (born 1985 in Padova, Italy), a speedway rider
Mattia Cassani (born 1983), Italian footballer
Mattia Cherubini (born 1988), Italian professional football player
Mattia Coletti (born 1984), Italian ski mountaineer
Mattia Dal Bello (born 1984), Italian professional football player
Mattia de Rossi (1637–1695), Italian architect of the Baroque period, active mainly in Rome and surrounding towns
Mattia De Sciglio (born 1992), Italian footballer
Mattia Destro (born 1991), Italian footballer
Mattia Fantinati (born 1975), Italian Politician
Mattia Ferrato (born 1989), Italian footballer who plays for Lega Pro Seconda Divisione team A.C. Carpenedolo
Mattia Gallon (born 1992), Italian professional football player
Mattia Gavazzi (born 1983), Italian road cyclist
Mattia Graffiedi (born 1980), Italian striker
Mattia Lanzano (born 1990), Italian professional footballer
Mattia Marchesetti (born 1983), Italian football (soccer) midfielder
Mattia Marchi (born 1989), Italian footballer
Mattia Masi (born 1984), Sammarinese footballer
Mattia Moreni (1920–1999), Italian artist
Mattia Mustacchio (born 1989), Italian footballer
Mattia Notari (born 1979), Italian football player who plays as a centre back
Mattia Pasini (born 1985), Italian Grand Prix motorcycle road racer
Mattia Passarini (born 1980), Italian football goalkeeper
Mattia Perin (born 1992), Italian professional football player
Mattia Pin (born 1988), Italian professional football player
Mattia Preti (1613–1699), Italian Baroque artist who worked in Italy and Malta
Mattia Raffa (born 1931), later known as Matilda Cuomo and known for being the wife of New York Governor Mario Cuomo and the mother of both New York Governor Andrew Cuomo and American television journalist Chris Cuomo
Mattia Righetti (born 1980), Italian rower
Mattia Rinaldini (born 1980), retired Italian professional football player
Mattia Sbragia (born 1952), Italian character actor
Mattia Serafini (born 1983), Italian footballer
Mattia Valoti (born 1993), Italian midfielder, currently on the books of Milan

Surname 

 Alphonse Mattia (born 1947), Italian-American furniture designer, woodworker, sculptor and professor
 Ettore G. Mattia (1910–1982), Italian journalist and actor
 Francisco Mattia (born 1988), Argentine footballer
 Isaac Mattia (born 1988), South Sudanese footballer
 Simone Mattia (born 1996), Italian footballer

Italian masculine given names
Surnames from given names